Diard is a French surname. Notable people with the surname include:

 Pierre-Médard Diard (1794–1863), French naturalist and explorer
 William Diard (1924–2009), American operatic tenor, teacher, musician, and actor
 Éric Diard (born 1965), French politician

French-language surnames